Last Exit is the eponymously titled live performance debut album of the free jazz group Last Exit. It was released in 1986 by Enemy Records.

Reception

In a review for AllMusic, Brian Olewnick wrote: "Entirely improvised, Last Exit nonetheless based most of its pieces on blues forms, even if highly abstracted. This bedrock allowed the musicians, particularly Brötzmann and Sharrock... to freely explore the outer boundaries of their instruments, sublimely soaring over the down to earth and dirty rhythm team of Laswell and Jackson. This tension... reached almost unbearable degrees; its release when they would slide back into a groove leaves the listener utterly drained. Subsequent albums... would come close to attaining this level of intensity and creativity, but Last Exit ranks as a pinnacle both in Laswell's career and in the rock/free improv genre it spawned. A classic release, one that should be in the collection of anyone interested in either contemporary free improvisation or the more creative branches of rock."

Writing for Trouser Press, Greg Kot stated: "On Last Exit, the sound is as unrelenting and incendiary as a blast-furnace... the overall impression is one of supernatural intensity, the agitated instrumental voicings of Sharrock and Brötzmann suggesting human cries."

Track listing

Accolades 

(*) designates unordered lists.

Personnel 
Last Exit
Peter Brötzmann – tenor saxophone
Ronald Shannon Jackson – drums, voice
Bill Laswell – Fender 6-string bass
Sonny Sharrock – guitar
Technical personnel
Last Exit – producer
Thi-Linh Le – design
Robert Musso – mixing
Nicky Skopelitis – musical arrangements
Peter Sturge – assistant engineer
Howie Weinberg – mastering

Release history

References

External links 
 Last Exit at Bandcamp
 

1986 live albums
Last Exit (free jazz band) albums
Enemy Records live albums